The Smith Carbine was a 0.50 caliber breech-loading rifle patented by Gilbert Smith on June 23, 1857 and successfully completed the military trials of the late 1850s. It was used by various cavalry units during the American Civil War.

The Smith Carbine was unique in that it broke apart in the middle for loading and it used rubber cartridges which sealed the gases in the breech. The downside was that these cartridges were difficult to remove.

The carbines were built by Massachusetts Arms Company of Chicopee Falls, Massachusetts; the American Machine Works in Springfield, Massachusetts; or the American Arms Company in Chicopee Falls. The name of the distributor for the manufacturer, Poultney & Trimble of Baltimore, Maryland, is often stamped on the carbine's receivers.

Service history
Early versions are often known to modern collectors as artillery models, but all Smiths were issued to cavalry units. Units known to have received the Smith Carbine include:

 1st Connecticut Cavalry Regiment
 7th Illinois Cavalry Regiment
 11th Illinois Cavalry Regiment
 1st Massachusetts Cavalry Regiment
 10th New York Cavalry Regiment
 6th Ohio Cavalry Regiment
 9th Ohio Cavalry Regiment
 7th Pennsylvania Cavalry Regiment
 17th Pennsylvania Cavalry Regiment
 3rd West Virginia Cavalry Regiment
 1st Alabama Cavalry Regiment (Union)
In 1865 the  Argentine Armed Forces acquired through Schuyler, Hartley & Graham around 400 examples to be used by cavalry and other forces in the fight against the indians and the rebellions in the interior. A few were sent to the front in Paraguay.

In 1871, 371 were  issued to line forces and four to the borders. Some were used on the western frontier, .50 Smith bullets were exacated at Fort General Paz(today Carlos Casares). 

They remained in use for line forces up to 1874 (the last inventory of the Artillery Park where they are mentioned dates from 1874), afterwards they were used by the Guardia National of Buenos Aires and other Buenos Aires volunteer forces until 1881.

See also
 Rifles in the American Civil War

References

American Civil War rifles
Carbines
Early rifles
Single-shot rifles